Alsu Ilkhamovna Murtazina (born 20 December 1987 in Kazan) is a Russian triple jumper. She has represented her country twice at the European Athletics Championships and won the Russian Athletics Championships in 2010.

International competitions

See also
List of people from Kazan

References

 

1987 births
Living people
Sportspeople from Kazan
Russian female triple jumpers
Competitors at the 2013 Summer Universiade
Russian Athletics Championships winners